SS Raymond Clapper was a Liberty ship built in the United States during World War II. She was named after Raymond Clapper, a commentator and news analyst for both radio and newspapers.

Construction
Raymond Clapper was laid down on 17 April 1944, under a Maritime Commission (MARCOM) contract, MC hull 2479, by the St. Johns River Shipbuilding Company, Jacksonville, Florida; she was sponsored by 	Miss Jane Clapper, the daughter of the namesake, and was launched on 23 May 1944.

History
She was allocated to the T.J. Stevenson & Co.Inc., on 13 June 1944. She was sold for commercial use, 12 June 1947, to Ocean Freighting & Brokerage Corp., and renamed T.J. Stevenson. After several name and owner changes on 7 May 1966, named Elias Dayfas II, she was abandoned off the Yucatán Peninsula, near , after developing leaks. She was taken in tow but later broke loose and was presumed sunk.

References

Bibliography

 
 
 
 

 

Liberty ships
Ships built in Jacksonville, Florida
1944 ships